The South African Railways Class 9E, Series 1 of 1978 is an electric locomotive.

In 1978 and 1979, the South African Railways placed twenty-five 50 kV AC , Series 1 electric locomotives with a Co-Co wheel arrangement in service on the Sishen-Saldanha iron ore export line.

Manufacturer
The 50 kV AC Class 9E, Series 1 electric locomotive was designed for the South African Railways (SAR) by the General Electric Company (GEC) and was built by Union Carriage & Wagon (UCW) in Nigel, Transvaal. UCW delivered twenty-five locomotives in 1978 and 1979, numbered in the range from E9001 to E9025.

Characteristics
The locomotive has a single full width air conditioned cab. At the rear end, the bodywork is lower to provide clearance for the 50 kV AC electrical equipment which is mounted on the roof. This consists of a single pantograph, a potential divider, a vacuum circuit breaker, a surge diverter and the main transformer’s high voltage terminal. The electrical control system is solid state, using thyristors.

Since huge voltage drops are often encountered between electric sub-stations, the locomotive was designed to be able to operate on a supply varying between 55 and 25 kV AC.

Series 1 locomotives have four braking systems, air brakes for the locomotive, train air braking, a handbrake and dynamic rheostatic braking which can dissipate .

By 2007, the entire fleet of both series of Class 9E electric locomotives were upgraded with Alstom's Agate train control and communication technology. The pantographs on most of these locomotives were also replaced by the single arm type.

The Series 1 and Series 2 Class 9Es can be visually distinguished from each other by their bogies, which were redesigned for the Series 2 locomotives.

Service
Class 9E locomotives are used on the  Sishen-Saldanha iron ore line to haul export ore from the open cast iron mines at Sishen in the Northern Cape to the harbour at Saldanha in the Western Cape. Most of the route is across the hot and dry Northern Cape, but the last  to Saldanha runs parallel to the Atlantic coastline and is subjected to the fog and salt sea air of the West Coast.

In South Africa, the Sishen-Saldanha line is unusual for several reasons.
 Construction, which began in 1973, was not undertaken by the SAR, but by the South African Iron and Steel Corporation (ISCOR), who operated the line with diesel-electric motive power. Operations on the Sishen-Saldanha iron ore line was only taken over from ISCOR by the SAR in 1977.
 It was electrified by the SAR at 50 kV AC, compared to the 25 kV AC high voltage which was used in other parts of the country.
 At the time, it was the longest 50 kV AC electrified railway line in the world.
 It is the only line in South Africa where electric and diesel-electric locomotives are consisted in mixed power use.

Mixed power
On the Sishen–Saldanha Orex line, General Electric (GE) Classes 34 series and  diesel-electric locomotives run consisted to Classes 9E and 15E electric locomotives to haul the 342 gondola iron ore trains.

A Class 9E or Class 15E electric locomotive serves as the master of each mixed electric and diesel-electric consist, with a total of between nine and twelve locomotives per train, twelve being the maximum number allowed. In effect, each ore train was made up of three separate 114 gondola trains consisted together, with the locomotives of all three trains controlled by means of a Locotrol radio distributed power control system by one crew in the leading electric locomotive. A typical train would therefore be made up of locomotive set A, 114 trucks, locomotive set B, 114 gondolas, locomotive set C, and 114 gondolas.

Some problems were experienced using this configuration and after a couple of major derailments, the locomotive configuration was changed to four sets, with locomotive set D initially made up of two Class 34 diesel-electric locomotives at the rear end of the train, pushing at between 40% and 50% of tractive power at all times, depending on the grades being traversed. The total maximum number allowed was still between nine and twelve locomotives per train.

Liveries
The whole series was delivered in the SAR Gulf Red livery with signal red cowcatchers, yellow whiskers and with the number plates on the sides mounted on three-stripe yellow wings. In the 1990s some of the units began to be repainted in the Spoornet orange livery with a yellow and blue chevron pattern on the cowcatchers. In the late 1990s many were repainted in the Spoornet blue livery with either solid or outline numbers on the sides.

Illustration

References

Co-Co locomotives
3060
Cape gauge railway locomotives
GEC locomotives
Railway locomotives introduced in 1978
Union Carriage & Wagon locomotives
50 kV AC locomotives